The Waldo water tower is a historic elevated steel water tower located in Waldo, Arkansas, United States, that is listed on the National Register of Historic Places.

Description
The tower was completed in 1936 by the Pittsburgh-Des Moines Steel Company in conjunction with the Public Works Administration as part of a project to improve the town's water supply. It was added to the National Register of Historic Places in 2007, as part of a multiple-property listing that included numerous other New Deal-era projects throughout Arkansas. The tower is still in operation as part of the town's water supply system.

See also

 National Register of Historic Places listings in Columbia County, Arkansas
 Cotter Water Tower
 Cotton Plant Water Tower
 Hampton Waterworks

References

External links

An Ambition to be Preferred: New Deal Recovery Efforts and Architecture in Arkansas, 1933-1943, By Holly Hope

Infrastructure completed in 1936
Water towers on the National Register of Historic Places in Arkansas
Public Works Administration in Arkansas
National Register of Historic Places in Columbia County, Arkansas
1935 establishments in Arkansas